Hessian, burlap in the United States and Canada, or crocus in Jamaica and the wider Caribbean, is a woven fabric usually made from skin of the jute plant or sisal fibres, which may be combined with other vegetable fibres to make rope, nets, and similar products. Gunny is similar in texture and construction.

Hessian, a dense woven fabric, has historically been produced as a coarse fabric, but more recently it is being used in a refined state known simply as jute as an eco-friendly material for bags, rugs and other products.

The name "hessian" is attributed to the historic use of the fabric as part of the uniform of soldiers from the former Landgraviate of Hesse and its successors, including the current German state of Hesse, who were called "Hessians". Hessian cloth is available in different types of construction, form, size and color.

The origin of the word burlap is unknown, though its earliest known appearance is in the late 17th century, and its etymology is speculated to derive from the Middle English borel ("coarse cloth"), the Old French burel and/or the Dutch boeren ("coarse"), in the latter case perhaps interfused with boer ("peasant"). The second element is the Dutch word lap, "piece of cloth".

History
Hessian was first exported from India in the early 19th century. It was traditionally used as backing for linoleum, rugs, and carpet.

In Jamaica and certain parts of the Caribbean (where it is only known as Crocus), many labourers who used to work on the plantations were not often given pleasant materials with which to make clothes. Some had access to cotton that was spun, woven, cut and sewn into serviceable clothing (often called homespun) while others had to make do with clothing fashioned from roughly hewn sacking. Labourers  used their resourcefulness to recycle discarded sacking and fashion them into garments that, although fairly uncomfortable by all accounts, provided protection from the heat and dust. A traditional costume of Jamaican Maroons uses fabric very similar to this material as a way of drawing an affinity and paying homage to the resourcefulness and creativity of their labourers who gained freedom. For the rest of the population, it was used to make bags for carrying loads of coffee and other items, edible or not.

Uses

Hessian is often used to make gunny sacks, and to ship goods like coffee beans and rooibos tea. It is breathable and so resists condensation and associated spoilage of contents. It is also durable enough to withstand rough handling in transit; these properties have also led to its use for temporary protection as wet covering to prevent rapid moisture loss in the setting of cement and concrete in the construction industry. Hessian is also commonly used to make effective sandbags; hessian sacks filled with sand are often used for flood mitigation in temporary embankments against floodwaters or field fortifications.

Shipping
The transportation of agricultural products often involves bags made from hessian jute fabric. Hessian jute bags (commonly known as gunnysacks) are used to ship wool, tobacco, and cotton, as well as foodstuffs such as coffee, flour, vegetables, and grains. Hessian jute's ability to allow the contents of bags to breathe makes it excellent for preventing or minimizing rotting due to trapped moisture. In some cases, hessian can even be specially treated to avoid specific kinds of rot and decay.

Hessian is also often used for the transportation of unprocessed dry tobacco. This material is used for much the same reasons as it would be used for coffee. Hessian sacks in the tobacco industry hold up to 200 kg (440lb) of tobacco, and due to hessian's toughness, a hessian sack can have a useful life of up to three years.

Landscaping and agriculture
Hessian is used to wrap the exposed roots of trees and shrubs when transplanting and also for erosion control on steep slopes. One major advantage of hessian jute fabric is that, because it is made entirely from natural vegetable fibers, it is completely biodegradable.

This property also makes it extremely useful in landscaping and agricultural uses that require incorporating fabric support into outdoor projects. Landscape designs that include tree transplantation often rely on hessian jute to ensure that young trees arrive at the planting venue intact and unharmed. This is achieved by wrapping hessian jute fabric around the roots and soil of a tree shortly after digging it from its original location. The breathability of the fabric allows sufficient aeration of the soil, and the hessian's moisture-resistant properties prevent excess water from accumulating and allowing the growth of mold, mildew, or other types of rot. Once planted, young trees may require the protection of hessian jute to ward off mice and other rodents that might otherwise eat their bark and compromise their structure. To keep rodents at bay, landscapers often wrap swathes of hessian jute around the trunks of young trees of all varieties.

In addition to protecting from animals, hessian jute also has the capacity to protect trees from excessive sun and wind. By building windbreaks from hessian jute, landscapers can exert some control over the environment in which young trees grow, thus maximizing their chances of growing to maturity so that they can withstand more intense weather conditions.

For planting grass, on areas that have steep slopes or high levels of soil erosion, a layer of hessian jute tacked on over grass seeds can prevent seeds from being moved by rain, runoff, or wind. Landscapers can use this fabric for many uses due to its strength, durability, moisture resistance, and protective properties.

Apparel
Due to its coarse texture, it is not commonly used in modern apparel. However, this roughness gave it a use in a religious context for mortification of the flesh, where individuals may wear an abrasive shirt called a cilice or "hair shirt" and in the wearing of "sackcloth" on Ash Wednesday.  During the Great Depression in the US, when cloth became relatively scarce in the largely agrarian parts of the country, many farming families used burlap cloth to sew their own clothes. However, prolonged exposure to the material can cause rashes on sensitive skin.

Owing to its durability, open weave, naturally non-shiny refraction and fuzzy texture, hessian is often used in the fabrication of ghillie suits for 3D camouflage. It was also a popular material for camouflage scrim on combat helmets during World War II. Until the advent of the plastic "leafy" multi-color net system following the Vietnam War, burlap scrim was also woven onto shrimp and fish netting to create large-scale military camouflage netting.

In art
Hessian has been used by artists as an alternative to cotton or linen as a stretched painting or working surface. In horror fiction, it is commonly used as a mask and as a mask for victims of beheading.

Emergency flood response
Hessian bags are often deployed as sandbags as a temporary response to flooding. Because of their material, they can either be reused or can be composted after use. Agencies like the State Emergency Service in Australia and Technisches Hilfswerk in Germany often deploy sandbags, and these are found in the majority of their emergency response vehicles. Plastic bags have been used as a substitute, but SES units have found hessian bags to be more versatile as they can be used in a variety of rescue applications: as an edge protector for rope rescue operations, for use as padding on slings used in animal rescue or used to dampen and beat out bush-fires.

In beekeeping
Hessian fabric is often used as smoker fuel in beekeeping because of its generous smoke generation and ease of ignition.

Building material 
In the 19th and first half of the 20th century, in Australia, hessian fabric, laid over a crude timber framework, was used to create the walls of primitive dwellings, particularly in mining towns and in settlements of unemployed people during the Great Depression.

The resulting semi-permanent structures — part way between a tent and a permanent dwelling made of conventional materials — were inexpensive to build. The durability and weatherproofing of the hessian walls were often improved by painting the hessian fabric with lime wash or conventional house paint, creating a less permeable, more rigid, rot-proof wall of a more attractive appearance. Hessian fabric was also used to create simple internal partitions. Roofing was typically corrugated iron, but sometimes canvas, usually with an earthen floor.

Hessian was also used for the internal lining of some slab huts in Australia.

References

Woven fabrics
Packaging materials

pl:Juta (tkanina)